Concordia Theological Quarterly is a peer-reviewed academic journal of theology published for the Lutheran Church–Missouri Synod by the faculty of Concordia Theological Seminary in Fort Wayne, Indiana. It continues The Springfielder and is published in January, April, July, and October each year. The journal is abstracted and indexed by the ATLA Religion Database, Religion Index One: Periodicals, International Bibliography of Periodical Literature on the Humanities and Social Sciences,  Old Testament Abstracts, and New Testament Abstracts.

The editor-in-chief is David P. Scaer, professor of Systematic Theology and New Testament and professor of Biblical and Systematic Theology at Concordia Theological Seminary.

External links
 

Quarterly journals
Protestant studies journals
English-language journals
Publications with year of establishment missing
Lutheran Church–Missouri Synod